The Finland national baseball team is the national baseball team of Finland. The team competes in the bi-annual European Baseball Championship.

Nordic Championships - Baltic Open

1997 - Sölvesborg, Sweden -
Finland - Sweden 0 - 5; 
Denmark - Finland 15 - 0; 
Norway - Finland 14 - 15;

2000, June 23–25 - Oslo, Norway -
Norway - Finland 8 - 1; 
Finland - Denmark 14 - 4; 
Sweden - Finland 15 - 5;

2001, June 2–4 - Skövde, Sweden -
Norway - Finland 7 - 12; 
Finland - Sweden 6 - 16; 
Denmark - Finland 12 - 24;

2003, May - Oslo, Norway -
Finland - Norway 5 - 1; 
Sweden - Finland 11 - 7; 
Norway - Finland 12 - 11; 
Finland - Sweden 15 - 16;

2004, May 28–30 - Skövde, Sweden -
Finland - Sweden 18 - 2; 
Norway - Finland 16 - 7; 
Sweden - Finland 6 - 7; 
Finland - Norway 14 - 8;

2005, May 14–15, Karlskoga, Sweden -
Finland - Sweden 18 - 8; 
Norway - Finland 12 - 7; 
Finland - Norway 11 - 4; 
Sweden - Finland 13 - 19; 
 
2006, May 25–27 - Karlskoga, Sweden -
Sweden - Finland 12 - 18; 
Finland - Norway 8 - 7; 
Finland - Sweden 0 - 18; 
Norway - Finland 5 - 3;

2007, May 18–20 - Karlskoga, Sweden -
Sweden - Finland 7 - 16; 
Finland - Norway 20 - 2; 
Finland - Sweden 11 - 5; 
Norway - Finland 7 - 13;

Baltic Open 2008, May 22–25 - Stockholm, Sweden -
Finland - Estonia 14 - 10; 
Sweden - Finland 22 - 1; 
Finland - Latvia 23 - 4; 
Sweden - Finland 15 - 7; 
 

National baseball teams in Europe
 
Baseball